Metzgeriothallus sharonae is the oldest known liverwort fossil, dating to the Middle Devonian.  It is a simple, thalloid organism.  M. metzgerioides is known from more fragmentary material dating to the Carboniferous of Scotland.

References

Middle Devonian plants
Mississippian plants
Middle Devonian first appearances
Mississippian extinctions
Metzgeriales
Late Devonian plants
Prehistoric plant genera
Liverwort genera